Han Qide (born July 1945) is a Chinese physician and politician. Han is currently the chairman of the Jiusan Society and a member of the Chinese Communist Party. He was the Vice Chairman of the Standing Committee of the National People's Congress and is the Vice Chairman of the National Committee of the Chinese People's Political Consultative Conference. He is also the president of the Chinese Society for Science and Technology.

Biography 

Han was born in Cixi, Ningbo, Zhejiang Province in July 1945. 1962–1968, Han studied medicine at the First Medical College of Shanghai (later known as Shanghai Medical University; in 2002, it was merged into Fudan University and became its medical college).

Han then worked as a medical staff and clinic physician in many hospitals in Shaanxi Province from 1968 to 1979. Han did his postgraduate study at the Xi'an Medical College (later merged into Xi'an Jiao Tong University and became its medical school). After graduation, Han taught at Beijing Medical College (later merged into Peking University and became its medical college) as a lecturer.

Han served as the last President of Beijing Medical University. When Beijing Medical University was merged into Peking University, Han was transferred into Peking University, and became the head of the Peking University's medical school (PKU Health Science Center), and the Executive Vice-president of the Peking University. He is currently President of the PKU Health Science Centre and Chairperson of the Board.

Han was elected as an Academician of the Chinese Academy of Sciences in 1997.

Political positions 
 2000–2002: Vice-Chairman of the Central Committee of Jiusan Society
 2002–2017: Chairman of the Central Committee of Jiusan Society 
 2003–2008: Vice-Chairman of the Standing Committee of the 10th National People's Congress 
 2008–2013: Vice-Chairman the Standing Committee of the 11th National People's Congress
 2013–2018: Vice-Chairman of the 12th National Committee of the Chinese People's Political Consultative Conference

Academic positions 
 1995–2000: Vice-President of the Beijing Medical University, and the Dean of its Postgraduate School; Beijing
 1997–present: Academician of the Chinese Academy of Sciences
 2000–2002: President of the Beijing Medical University
 2002–2003: Executive Vice-President of Peking University, and the Dean of Peking University Health Science Center   
 2002–2003: Vice-Chairman of the China Association for Science and Technology  
 2006–2016: Chairman of the China Association for Science and Technology

References

External links 
 China Vitae: Biography of HAN Qide  

1945 births
Living people
Fudan University alumni
Members of the Chinese Academy of Sciences
Members of the Jiusan Society
Academic staff of Peking University
People from Cixi
People's Republic of China politicians from Zhejiang
Physicians from Zhejiang
Politicians from Ningbo
Scientists from Ningbo
Vice Chairpersons of the National Committee of the Chinese People's Political Consultative Conference
Vice Chairpersons of the National People's Congress
Xi'an Jiaotong University alumni
Educators from Ningbo
Members of the National Academy of Medicine